Banner is a type of administrative division, and may more specifically refer to:

Compilation from Qing Dynasty era
The Eight Banners are former administrative divisions of China into which all Manchu households were placed, primarily for military purposes.
Banner (Qosighun or khoshun) as former division of all Mongols under Qing rule (includes Inner/Outer Mongolia) grouped in aimag (league), sometimes transcribed by hoshuns or khoshuns, were the battalion level of administrative/military subdivision in the Mongol army. 
Banner (Inner Mongolia) as an administrative division of Inner Mongolia Autonomous Region in the People's Republic of China, equivalent to a Chinese county (|[]) in the rest of China.
An Autonomous banner is an area associated with one or more ethnic minorities designated as autonomous within the People's Republic of China.
Kozhuun, subdivisions of former Tannu Uriankhai and now Russian Tuva.

Anatolia
A Bandon (Byzantine Empire) was the lowest Byzantine administrative-cum-military unit. "Bandon" means "banner".
Sanjak, literally "a banner, flag", was the original first level subdivision of the Ottoman Empire.

Arab world
Liwa, an Arabic term meaning "banner" as a type of administrative division.

See also
Banner (disambiguation)

Notes and references

Types of administrative division